Federal Highway 23 (Fed. 23) is a toll-free part of the federal highway corridors.

Route
The highway starts in the north in Guanacevi, Durango, and ends to the south in Jocotepec, Jalisco. 

Fed. 23 intersects multiple federal highways along its route, such as: Fed. 45 north of Victoria de Durango, Fed. 44 near San Juan de Peyotan, NAY, Fed. 15, Fed. 54 and Fed. 70 in Guadalajara.

References

023
Transportation in Guadalajara, Jalisco
Transportation in Durango
Transportation in Jalisco
Transportation in Zacatecas